Jackson and Walford, later Jackson, Walford, and Hodder from 1861 was a London publishing firm and predecessor firm of Hodder & Stoughton. at 18 St Paul's Churchyard and 27 Paternoster Row in 1871 (which was the former address of the later Ward & Co.) The publishers with their successive name changes were one of many London publishers that operated around St. Paul's Churchyard and Paternoster Row. They published the Congregational Year Books, which were the publications of the "Congregational Union of England and Wales, and the Confederated Societies." Matthew Hodder apprenticed there from the age of fourteen and became a partner in 1861. Upon the retirement of Messrs. Jackson and Walford in 1868, Thomas Wilberforce Stoughton joined Hodder and the firm was renamed Hodder & Stoughton. The firm then published both religious and secular works and has survived into the present day as an imprint of Hodder Headline.

References

Attenborough, John. A Living Memory: Hodder and Stoughton 1868-1975. London: Hodder and Stoughton, 1975. 
Bennett, Bryan, and Anthony Hamilton. Edward Arnold: 100 Years of Publishing. Illustrated with black and white plates, including a frontispiece of Edward Arnold. London: Edward Arnold (A Division of Hodder & Stoughton), 1990. 

Book publishing companies of the United Kingdom
Christian mass media companies
Christian publishing companies
1861 establishments in England
Publishing companies established in 1861